Barbara Ellen Smith is an American author, activist, and educator. In 2017 she was named professor emerita of Virginia Tech. Smith is known for her involvement and writing about social justice in Appalachia, particularly the Black lung movement and advocacy for coal miners.

Education and career  

Smith was born in 1951 in Ann Arbor, Michigan and was raised in Indiana. She graduated from Antioch College in 1972 with Bachelor of Arts degree in political science. She began working with the Black Lung Movement and teaching at an elementary school in Anawalt, West Virginia. Smith served as Director of Research and Education at the Southeast Women's Employment Coalition in Lexington, Kentucky, and as a board member for the Highlander Research and Education Center. She returned to academia and acquired both her Master's Degree and Ph.D. (1981) from Brandeis University. She later became the Director of the Women's Studies Program at the University of Memphis, and then transition to Virginia Tech in 2005 where, as of 2022, she is professor emerita.

Work 
During Smith's youth she attended schools where most of her classmates were African American, making her conscious of the issues of race at a young age and she attributes her interest in racial justice to the ripple effects of the Civil Rights Movement in her local community. In 1981, Smith was granted a National Science Foundation fellowship that she was able to explore topics such as equal pay, representation in the work force, and other issues for working-class women. When she moved to Memphis, Tennessee in 1995, her worked shifted to focus on immigration and working-class wages. She also worked to counteract the wage inequities between male and female professors at the University of Memphis by establishing support groups and networks for women at the university.

In 1989 she also edited a book about economic issues in Appalachia, and her 1999 book Neither separate nor equal addressed conditions for women in the south. While working on what would be come Digging our own graves: coal miners & the struggle over black lung disease Smith traveled to West Virginia to further research the decline of the coal industry in Appalachia, the economic and health crises coal miners face, and what the future looks like in terms of environmental justice in the region.

Selected publications

Awards and honors 
Smith's honors include the ASPECT Outstanding Faculty Award, the Department of Sociology Outstanding Graduate Faculty Award, and the Department of Sociology Undergraduate Teaching Excellence Award.

Further reading

References 

Living people
1951 births
Antioch College alumni
Brandeis University alumni
Virginia Tech people
University of Memphis faculty
Appalachian studies